Lilian Jiménez is an American attorney and politician serving as a member of the Illinois House of Representatives for the 4th district. Elected in November 2022, she assumed office on December 15, 2022.

Early life and education 
Jiménez was born and raised in Chicago. She earned a Bachelor of Arts degree in political science from DePaul University and a Juris Doctor from the DePaul University College of Law.

Career 
From 2000 to 2003, Jiménez worked as the education coordinator for Workers United. She worked as a community organizer for the Erie Neighborhood House and as a citizenship coordinator for the Association House of Chicago. From 2006 to 2008, Jiménez worked as a paralegal for the Mexican American Legal Defense and Educational Fund. From 2009 to 2011, she served as a civil rights investigator in the United States Department of Health and Human Services. Jiménez worked as the national legal coordinator for the Restaurant Opportunities Center before joining the Fair Labor Standards Division of the Illinois Department of Labor in 2012. From 2015 to 2017, she served on Chuy García's staff during his tenure on the Cook County Board of Commissioners. From 2019 to 2022, Jiménez served as the administrator of the Office of Immigrant & Refugee Services in the Illinois Department of Human Services.

Illinois House of Representatives
Jiménez was elected to the Illinois House of Representatives to succeed Delia Ramirez who was elected to the United States House of Representatives. Ramirez resigned December 14, 2022. To fill the vacancy, the Democratic Representative Committee of the 4th Representative District appointed Representative-elect Jiménez to serve in the remainder of the 102nd General Assembly.

References 

Living people
Politicians from Chicago
Lawyers from Chicago
DePaul University alumni
DePaul University College of Law alumni
Illinois Democrats
Members of the Illinois House of Representatives
Women state legislators in Illinois
United States Department of Health and Human Services officials
21st-century American politicians
21st-century American women politicians
Year of birth missing (living people)